Jan Rodvang (24 December 1939 – 6 November 2020) was a Norwegian football defender. He mainly played for Lyn, becoming league champion in 1964 and 1968 and cup champion in 1967 and 1968. He represented Norway as an U21, B and senior international.

References

1939 births
2020 deaths
People from Asker
Norwegian footballers
Asker Fotball players
Lyn Fotball players
Norway under-21 international footballers
Norway international footballers
Association football defenders
Sportspeople from Viken (county)